Manzhouli railway station, formerly known as Manchzhuriya station in Russian, is a railway station in Manzhouli, Hulunbuir, Inner Mongolia, China. It is managed by the China Railway Harbin Group, and as one of the stations of Harbin–Manzhouli Railway.

Manzhouli is the China's main rail gateway to Russia. The station on the opposite, Russian, side of the border, is Zabaikalsk.

In 2022, an expansion to the freight portion of the station was completed.

Around the station

North 
 Honglin Supermarket
 Hongli Convenience Supermarket
 Baifang Shopping Center
 South District Hospital
 Manzhouli Museum

South 
 Manzhouli Friendship Hotel
 Manzhouli Pearl Hotel
 Manzhouli Social Insurance Bureau
 The Second Branch of Electronic Business Hotel
 The Local people's court of Manzhouli
 Victoria Business Plaza
 Henglong Shopping Center

References 

Stations on the Harbin–Manzhouli Railway
Railway stations in Inner Mongolia